Michael Thomas Hemann (born 1971) is an American cancer geneticist and associate professor in the David H. Koch Institute for Integrated Cancer Research at the Massachusetts Institute of Technology. The research in Hemann's laboratory focuses on identification and characterization of genes involved in tumor formation, cancer progression, and chemotherapeutic response.

Michael Thomas Hemann was born in Evanston, Illinois, in 1971, but grew up in Shaker Heights, Ohio. He attended Wesleyan University for college, eventually graduating with a bachelor’s degree in molecular biology and biochemistry in 1993. He went on to receive his Ph.D. in human genetics from Johns Hopkins University School of Medicine in 2001. His thesis work was conducted in Carol Greider's lab.

Publications

References 

American geneticists
Living people
Massachusetts Institute of Technology faculty
1971 births
Scientists from Cleveland
Place of birth missing (living people)